This is a list of episodes of Shinhwa Broadcast, a South Korean variety television programme, broadcast on general cable channel Joongang Tongyang Broadcasting Company (jTBC). The show is hosted by the six-member boy band Shinhwa: Eric Mun, Lee Min-woo, Kim Dong-wan, Shin Hye-sung, Jun Jin and Andy Lee.

It premiered on Saturday, 17 March 2012, at 22:00. On 13 October, the show was given a new timeslot and changed format, from episode 33 on 28 October, it aired on Sundays at 19:40, where member received Private Tutorials on various topics. For the month of March 2013, the show went on hiatus, and returned on 7 April with a new format of Mother’s Touch cooking competition. The show, once again, went on hiatus after the 16 June broadcast and returned on 3 November 2013 with a new format for season two. As of 8 December 2013, 65 episodes in two seasons have been broadcast.

Season one: Channels
Timeslot: Saturdays at 22:00/23:00

Season two: Tutorials
The format for segment was studio based. Where each week experts on a specific topic were invited to give Shinhwa members private tutorials to learn the tricks of their trade. The episodes also started with a briefing by Shin Hye-sung, dubbed 'Shin Brief'. Timeslot: Sundays at 19:40

No episode was aired on 16 December 2012, due to the presidential debates for the 2012 South Korean presidential election.

Season three: Mother’s Touch cooking competition
Shinhwa members in a new concept for the show learn secret recipes and cooking techniques from mothers. Whose dishes were then judged alongside their teachers' as the authentic dish with the real mother's touch. The last member to guess correctly the identity of the guest mother became 'Shinhwa's feet', i.e. errand boy, and had to wear a bright orange tracksuit emblazoned as such, for the remainder of the episode. Kim Dong-wan did not join the group for the filming this segment, due to filming commitments for daily drama Cheer Up, Mr. Kim! on Korean Broadcasting System.

Season 2: Little Legends 
Shinhwa went to look for unsung heroes in the community and will experience their daily lives for 2 days and 1 night. Kim Dong-wan confirmed his departure from the show after not participating in Mother's Touch competition segment of season one and stated that he wishes to concentrate on his acting career.ntrate on his acting career.

References

External links
  at JTBC 
 

Shinhwa
Shinhwa Broadcast episodes
Shinhwa Broadcast episodes